Ordowt may refer to:
 Ordowt-e Darvish
 Ordowt-e Kal
 Ordowt-e Nazer